The Skunk 11 is a Canadian utility dinghy that can be rowed, used as  a motorboat, fishing boat or as a sailing dinghy. It was designed by Hubert Vandestadt and first built in 1969.

Production
The design was built by Vandestadt & McGruer in Owen Sound, Ontario, Canada, but the company went out of business in 1987 and production had ended by then.

Design
The Skunk 11 is a recreational sailboat, built predominantly of fibreglass, with wood trim. It is a Gunter rigged sloop with a free-standing mast, aluminum spars, a raked stem, plumb transom, a transom-hung rudder made from mahogany controlled by a tiller and a retractable fibreglass centreboard. The rudder and centreboard are "kick up" designs. It displaces .

The boat may also be rowed and is equipped with oarlocks for that role.

The recessed foredeck has a storage area.

Variants
Skunk
The gunter rig mean all three spars are short and will store inside the boat's hull.
Super Skunk
This model was introduced in 1981, has a conventional sloop rig and additional sail area, totalling .

Operational history
In a 1994 review Richard Sherwood wrote, the "Skunk is a light, easily transported boat. Because of the gunter rig, all spars will fit inside the boat. There are no stays. The Super Skunk is Marconi rigged and has an extra 10 square feet of mainsail. Besides sailing, the Skunk may be used for fishing, as an outboard, or as a rowboat."

See also
List of sailing boat types

Similar boats
Blue Crab 11
Echo 12
Puffer (dinghy)
Shrimp (dinghy)

References

External links

Dinghies
1960s sailboat type designs
Sailboat type designs by Hubert Vandestadt
Sailboat types built by Vandestadt and McGruer Limited